This is a list of scandals or controversies whose names include a -gate suffix, by analogy with the Watergate scandal, as well as other incidents to which the suffix has (often facetiously) been applied. This list also includes controversies that are widely referred to with a -gate suffix, but may be referred to by another more common name (such as the New Orleans Saints bounty scandal, known as "Bountygate"). Use of the -gate suffix has spread beyond American English to many other countries and languages.

Etymology, usage, and history of -gate 

The suffix -gate derives from the Watergate scandal of the United States in the early 1970s, which resulted in the resignation of US President Richard Nixon. The scandal was named after the Watergate complex in Washington, D.C., where the burglary giving rise to the scandal took place; the complex itself was named after the "Water Gate" area where symphony orchestra concerts were staged on the Potomac River between 1935 and 1965.

The suffix has become productive as a libfix and is used to embellish a noun or name to suggest the existence of a far-reaching scandal, particularly in politics and government. As a CBC News column noted in 2001, the term may "suggest unethical behaviour and a cover-up".

Such usages have been criticized by some commentators as clichéd and misleading. James Stanyer comments that "revelations are given the 'gate' suffix to add a thin veil of credibility, following 'Watergate', but most bear no resemblance to the painstaking investigation of that particular piece of presidential corruption". Stanyer links the widespread use of -gate to what the sociologist John Thompson calls "scandal syndrome":

The adoption of -gate to suggest the existence of a scandal was promoted by William Safire, the conservative New York Times columnist and former Nixon administration speechwriter. As early as September 1974 he wrote of "Vietgate", a proposed pardon of the Watergate criminals and Vietnam War draft dodgers. Subsequently, he coined numerous -gate terms, including Billygate, Briefingate, Contragate, Deavergate, Debategate, Doublebillingsgate (of which he later said "My best [-gate coinage] was the encapsulation of a minor ... scandal as doublebillingsgate"), Frankiegate, Franklingate, Genschergate, Housegate, Iraqgate, Koreagate, Lancegate, Maggiegate, Nannygate, Raidergate, Scalpgate, Travelgate, Troopergate and Whitewatergate. The New York magazine suggested that his aim in doing so was "rehabilitating Nixon by relentlessly tarring his successors with the same rhetorical brush – diminished guilt by association". Safire himself later said to author Eric Alterman that he "may have been seeking to minimize the relative importance of the crimes committed by his former boss with this silliness".

The usage has spread into languages other than English; examples of -gate being used to refer to local political scandals have been reported from Argentina, Germany, South Korea, Hungary, Greece and the former Yugoslavia. The term is also used in Mandarin Chinese with the suffix -mén.

The use of a suffix in this way is not new. -mandering has long been used as a suffix by a politician's name in analogy with gerrymandering ("Henry-mandering" was used in 1852). The use of -ghazi is a play on the investigation into the 2012 Benghazi attack, which despite numerous official investigations into the possibility of government cover-ups, has resulted in no criminal charges or major repercussions for the individuals supposedly involved.  -ghazi may be seen as carrying an ironic or self-effacing connotation in its usage, implying that the event described has the appearance and media coverage of a scandal, but does not actually amount to much in a grander sense.

Some commentators have characterized this use of the -gate suffix as a snowclone. But Geoffrey Pullum, the coiner of the term snowclone, considers that it is only a "lexical word-formation analog". Martha Brockenbrough, the founder of The Society for the Promotion of Good Grammar, said that no one should aspire to write with cliches and that although they do help to get a lot of complicated things across in few words that they are not a good way to get people to keep reading what you're writing.

Similar phenomena

Scandals 

These scandals have been given the -gate suffix.

Arts and entertainment

Journalism and academics

Politics

Sports

Technology

Other

Conspiracy theories 
These conspiracy theories have been given the -gate suffix by both supporters and critics of them.

In popular culture 
These fictional scandals have been given the -gate suffix by the creators of the artistic work.

Film and television

References

External links 

 
 
 Campbell, Alex. Turning a scandal into a '-gate' BBC News, May 11, 2013.

gate
Snowclones
Politics-related lists
Political terminology of the United States
Gate
English suffixes

fr:Gate#En suffixe